Super Soul Sunday is a self-help talk show hosted by Oprah Winfrey, which airs on the Oprah Winfrey Network. Super Soul Sunday premiered on October 16, 2011.

Format
Super Soul Sunday is designed to help viewers awaken to their best selves and discover a deeper connection to the world around them. Recognized by the National Academy of Television Arts and Sciences with Daytime Emmy Awards, the Alliance for Women in Media Foundation with a Gracie Award and the Religion Communicators Council with a Wilbur Award, Super Soul Sunday features conversations between Oprah and philosophers, authors, visionaries, and spiritual leaders. It presents an array of perspectives on what it means to be alive in today’s world. Exploring themes and issues including happiness, personal fulfillment, spirituality and conscious living, guests who have appeared include: Elie Wiesel, Maya Angelou, Brené Brown, India Arie, Wayne Dyer, Gary Zukav, Iyanla Vanzant, Marianne Williamson, Phil Jackson, Ram Dass, Eckhart Tolle, Diana Nyad, Sarah Ban Breathnach, and Thich Nhat Hanh.

Oprah's SuperSoul Conversations Podcast (2017–present)
On August 6, 2017 Oprah's SuperSoul Conversations podcast premiered, featuring interviews pulled from the Super Soul Sunday television show and new conversations recorded exclusively for the podcast. New conversations recorded exclusively for the podcast have featured such guests as: Reese Witherspoon, Mindy Kaling, Jimmy Kimmel, Amy Schumer, Phil McGraw, Will.i.am, Maria Shriver, former mayor of New Orleans Mitch Landrieu, Ralph Lauren, Tina Turner, Julia Roberts, and Michelle Obama.

On February 7, 2018, Winfrey hosted a live show for the podcast at the Apollo Theatre in New York City. The show was hosted by Jessica Williams and Phoebe Robinson of 2 Dope Queens and featured interviews with Jordan Peele, Stephen Colbert, Salma Hayek Pinault, Trevor Noah, Lin-Manuel Miranda, and Yara Shahidi.

On February 8, 2019, Winfrey hosted Oprah's SuperSoul Conversations from Times Square, another live show for the podcast and television series at PlayStation Theater in New York City. The show featured interviews with Bradley Cooper, Michael B. Jordan, Beto O'Rourke, Melinda Gates, and Lisa Borders.

Super Soul on discovery+ (2021–present)
On March 6, 2021 a new streaming series hosted by Winfrey called SuperSoul premiered on the discovery+ streaming platform. Season one episodes included interviews with Andra Day, Chip and Joanna Gaines, Priyanka Chopra Jonas, Sharon Stone, Jon Meacham, Dr. Bruce Perry, and Julianna Margulies.

Episodes

Series overview

Season 1 (2011–12)

Season 2 (2012)

Season 3 (2012)

Season 4 (2012)

Season 5 (2013)

Season 6 (2013)

Season 7 (2013)

Season 8 (2014)

Season 9 (2014)

Season 10 (2015)

Season 11 (2015)

Season 12 (2016)

Season 13 (2016)

Season 14 (2017)

Season 15 (2018–19)

Season 16 (2019)

Season 17 (2020–21)

Awards and nominations

References

External links
 
 

Oprah Winfrey Network original programming
2011 American television series debuts
English-language television shows
Television series by Harpo Productions